Saint Damien may refer to:
 Saint-Damien, Quebec, a municipality in Canada
 Saint-Damien-de-Buckland, Quebec, a village in Canada
 Father Damien (1840–1889), also called Saint Damien of Molokai, a Roman Catholic priest from Belgium
 Saints Cosmas and Damian, twins and early Christian martyrs born in Arabia

See also: Pope Damian of Alexandria